Sigurd Pettersen (born 28 February 1980) is a Norwegian former ski jumper. His greatest achievement is winning the 2003–04 Four Hills Tournament, with wins in Oberstdorf, Garmisch-Partenkirchen and Bischofshofen.

Pettersen also won two bronze medals in the team large hill events at the FIS Nordic World Ski Championships (2003, 2005) and had his best individual finish of 10th in the 2005 event. He won a gold medal in the team event at the FIS Ski-Flying World Championships 2004.

Pettersen's best individual finish at the Winter Olympics was 24th in the individual large hill at Turin in 2006. He also has six individual career victories, all in the large hill, from 2002 to 2004.

Pettersen's own ski club is Rollag og Veggli in Rollag, Norway.

He has his education from the Norwegian School of Sport Sciences.

Honours 
Four Hills Tournament champion: 2003/2004

References

1980 births
Living people
Norwegian School of Sport Sciences alumni
Norwegian male ski jumpers
Olympic ski jumpers of Norway
People from Buskerud
Ski jumpers at the 2006 Winter Olympics
FIS Nordic World Ski Championships medalists in ski jumping
Sportspeople from Viken (county)
21st-century Norwegian people